Year 1069 (MLXIX) was a common year starting on Thursday (link will display the full calendar) of the Julian calendar.

Events 
 By place 
 Byzantine Empire 
 Spring –  Emperor Romanos IV begins a campaign against the Seljuk Turks, and marches towards the Euphrates via Melitene. He crosses the river at Romanopolis (modern Turkey), and captures the strategic fortress city of Chliat on the north-western shore of Lake Van. Romanos leaves a Byzantine rear guard on the upper Euphrates under General Philaretos Brachamios with orders to defend the Mesopotamian frontier.
 Seljuk forces under Alp Arslan defeat the Byzantine rear guard and advance deep into Cappadocia and Lycaonia. They plunder at will, but fail to capture the city of Iconium. Romanos retreats and returns to Constantinople. Alp Arslan takes advantage of Romanos' retreat and captures Manzikert. He recaptures the strategical fortress cities of Chliat and Van, consolidating his control over the Lake Van region.

 Europe 
 Spring – Romanos IV sends a Byzantine fleet (supported with an army) to relieve the siege of Bari. The Normans under Robert Guiscard defeat the Byzantines, and occupy the cities of Gravina and Obbiano in Apulia.
 February 28 – King Abbad II al-Mu'tadid dies after a 27-year reign. He is succeeded by his son Al-Mu'tamid ibn Abbad, who becomes the ruler of the Taifa of Seville in Al-Andalus (until 1091).

 England 
 January 28 – Northumbrians kill the new Norman earl of Northumbria, Robert de Comines, at Durham, and attack York.
 King Sweyn II of Denmark lands a fleet in the Humber in support of the Northumbrian rebels and they join him to burn York, attacking its two castles and destroying the old Minster.
 At Stafford, William the Conqueror swiftly defeats a rebellion led by Edwin, Earl of Mercia.
 Winter of 1069–1070 – Harrying of the North: King William the Conqueror quells rebellions made by his English subjects against his rule, campaigning through the north of England with his forces, burning houses, crops, cattle and land from York to Durham, resulting in the deaths of over 100,000 people, mainly from starvation and winter cold.

 Asia 
 Emperor Shenzong of Song China appoints Wang Anshi as his chief chancellor. He implements the New Policies, which include financial and trade reforms, defense and order, institution of the baojia system, etc.
 Nam tiến, the southward expansion of the territory of Vietnam, begins when a Lý dynasty army attacks Champa, capturing King Rudravarman III.

Births 
 Anseau of Garlande, French nobleman (d. 1118)
 Kamakura Gongorō Kagemasa, Japanese samurai
 Leo Diogenes, Byzantine co-emperor (d. 1087)
 Approximate date
 Mieszko Bolesławowic, Polish prince (d.1089)
 Diego Gelmírez, Galician archbishop

Deaths 
 January 28 – Robert de Comines, English nobleman
 February 28 – Abbad II al-Mu'tadid, Abbadid king 
 April 28 – Magnus II (Haraldsson), king of Norway
 August 15 – Ibn Hazm, Moorish historian (b. 994)
 September 11 – Ealdred, archbishop of York 
 December 24 – Dedi II (the Younger), margrave of Lower Lusatia (b. c.997)
 Godfrey III (the Bearded), duke of Lower Lorraine
 Gytha Thorkelsdóttir, Danish noblewoman (b. 997)
 Pedro Seguin (or Seguini), bishop of Ourense 
 Tilopa, Indian tantric practitioner (b. 988)
 Approximate date – Rhiwallon ap Cynfyn, Welsh king (b. c.1020)

References